Cania is a commune in Cantemir District, Moldova. It is composed of two villages, Cania and Iepureni.

References

Communes of Cantemir District